Haukedalen is a village in Sunnfjord Municipality in Vestland county, Norway. The village is located in the Haukedalen valley at the northwestern end of the lake Haukedalsvatnet. The village lies in a fairly remote valley surrounded by the Gaularfjellet mountains. Haukedalen Church is located in the village.

References

Villages in Vestland
Sunnfjord